Suhaib is a given name. Notable people with the name include:

 Suhaib Gasmelbari (born 1979), Sudanese film director, screenwriter, and cinematographer
 Suhaib Ilyasi (born 1966), Indian television producer and director
 Suhaib Webb (born 1972), American Muslim imam